The National Agency for the Prohibition of Trafficking in Persons (NAPTIP) is a law enforcement agency of the Federal Government of Nigeria, founded on the 14th of July, 2003 by the Trafficking in Persons (Prohibition) Enforcement and Administration Act of 2003 in order to combat human trafficking and other similar human rights violations.

NAPTIP is a national compliance to the international obligation under the Trafficking in Persons Protocol and responds to the need to prevent, suppress and punish trafficking in persons, especially women and children, complementing the United Nations Transnational Organized Crime Convention (UNTOC). It is one of the agencies under the supervision of the Federal Ministry of Humanitarian Affairs, Disaster Management and Social Development.

Since inception, the agency have investigated over ten thousand cases of human trafficking and prosecuted about five hundred defaulters. Between 2003 and 2017, they convicted over 331 human traffickers and rescued about 3000 victims from Libya and other places. Senator Basheer Mohammed took over from Mrs Imaan Suleiman Ibrahim as the Director General of the National Agency for the Prohibition of Trafficking in Persons (NAPTIP) in May, 2021. In September, 2021, Senator Basheer Mohammed was replaced by Fatima Waziri-Azi.

Origin 
NAPTIP was established under a federal bill on July 14, 2003 by the Trafficking in Persons(Prohibition) Enforcement and Administration Act (2003) through the advocacy of Women Trafficking and Child Labour Eradication Foundation (WOTCLEF).

Objectives
NAPTIP is mandated to enforce the Trafficking in Persons(Prohibition) Enforcement and Administration Act (TIPPEA) in Nigeria

Departments 
To discharge its duty  smoothly in combating human trafficking, the agency has the following departments and units:       
 Investigation and Monitoring
 Legal and Prosecution.
 Counselling & Rehabilitation
 Public Enlightenment
 Research and Programmes Development
 Training and Manpower Development.
 Administration.
 Finance and Accounts.

Units 
 Procurement
 Press and Public Relations
 Intelligence and International Cooperation.
 Audit.
 Reforms.
 Rapid Response Squad (RRS)

Zonal Commands 
Currently, the agency has 9 zonal commands located in Lagos, Benin, Enugu, Uyo, Sokoto, Maiduguri, Oshogbo, and Makurdi.

Working With CSOs 
The agency partners non-government organizations to carry out its tasks in different states. In 2013, NAPTIP started partnering with Devatop Centre for Africa Development, a youth-led anti-human trafficking organization,  to train and empower youth in combating human trafficking in Nigeria, as well as investigating cases and rescuing victims. NAPTIP also partners with Network of CSOs Against Child Trafficking, Abuse and Labour, Women Trafficking and Child Labour Eradication Foundation, and many others.

Working With EFCC 
NAPTIP requested for more support from the Economic and Financial Crimes Commission, EFCC, in their quest to rid the country of human trafficking and its attendant consequences on the image of Nigeria. This request was made by the Director General of the agency, Imaan Sulaiman-Ibrahim.

Achievements 
Since its inception, the agency has had over 331 convictions on human trafficking, as of September 2017. 
Between 2003 and 2017, over 3000 victims have been rescued by NAPTIP. The agency has been at the forefront of rescuing and rehabilitating Nigerians from Libya, with the help of Federal Government, International Office or Migration, and other international organizations, which has gotten a commendation from United States.

References

External links 
 Official website
 Watch Videos

Human trafficking in Nigeria
Non-profit organizations based in Nigeria
Human rights organizations based in Nigeria
Law enforcement agencies of Nigeria